This is a list of banks and financial institutions in Nepal licensed by the Nepal Rastra Bank.

Class A: Commercial banks 
Commercial banks are rated as Class "A" banks by the Nepal Rastra Bank. There are 21 commercial banks as of 24 February 2023.

Banks with government investment

Private Sector Banks

Defunct commercial banks

Class B: Development banks 

Development banks are rated as Class "B" banks by the Nepal Rastra Bank. There are 17 development banks as of October 2022.

Class C: Finance Companies

Finance companies are rated as Class "C" banks by the Nepal Rastra Bank. There are 17 finance companies as of October 2022.

Class D: Micro Finance Financial Institutions
Micro finance financial institutions are rated as Class "D" banks by the Nepal Rastra Bank. There are 63 finance companies as of March 2023.

References

 
Nepal
Nepal
Banks